AREWA24 is a Nigerian satellite television channel available on DSTV, GOtv, and Startimes that showcases the lifestyle of the Northern Region, Nigeria. It is the first free-to-air channel to use the Hausa language.

History 
Founded in 2014, AREWA24 is a 100% Nigerian media corporation that includes a television network, a high-capacity Hausa production studio and a global Subscription video on demand service. AREWA24 is the leading and consistently highest-rated Hausa language entertainment and lifestyle television network in Nigeria and West Africa, fully distributed as a Free-to-air satellite channel and as part of all major Pay TV lineups – DStv, GOtv, StarTimes, TSTV and Canal+.

AREWA24 is a home to the largest library of HD Hausa language content across genres and formats anywhere in the world. Along with its entertainment programming, AREWA24 also serves its communities by addressing critical community-relevant issues such as girl education, corruption, women’s issues, health challenges, interreligious violence and youth employment.

In these areas, AREWA24 has worked on collaborative projects with the MacArthur Foundation, Ford Foundation, United Nations, WHO, Nigeria Centre for Disease Control, Equal Access International and Beyond Conflict. Through entertainment and fictional dramas, important, relevant and community-positive messaging can be highly effective.

References

Television stations in Nigeria
Hausa-language mass media
Television in minority languages